is the 15th single of the J-pop singer Kotoko. The title track was used as the theme song for the Xbox 360/PS3 game BlazBlue: Continuum Shift. This is Kotoko's second tie-up with the game after Ao-Iconoclast.

This single's catalog number is GNCV-0024.

Track listing 
 — 4:06
Lyrics: Kotoko
Composition/arrangement: C.G mix
 — 4:33
Lyrics: Kotoko
Composition/arrangement: Kenji Arai
"Hekira no Sora e Izanaedo" (Instrumental)
"Digital Snail" (Instrumental)

Charts and sales
Daily chart peak - #13
Weekly chart peak - #18
Total sales - 7,618 units

References

2010 singles
Kotoko (singer) songs
Songs with lyrics by Kotoko (musician)
2010 songs